Penicillus capitatus is a species of green algae''.

References

 Vroom, "Hawaiian Reef Algae", UH Manoa
 Marine Species Identification Portal

Udoteaceae